Kim Herold (born 1979) is a Finland-Swedish model and singer-songwriter. He has been the lead singer of Finnish band Humane since 2004. He started solo career in 2008. In 2009 he participated in Tanssii tähtien kanssa, the Finnish version of Dancing with the Stars.

Discography (solo)

Albums 
 DrunkSoberLoveMusic (15 October 2008)
 Easy Love (5 October 2011)

Singles 
 "Purple Skies" (Kim Herold & Tidjân) (16 April 2008 – Digital single / Promo Single)
 "Social Butterfly" (19 May 2008 – Digital single / Promo)
 "Love in a Bottle" (17 September 2008 – Digital single / Promo)
 "Panic in the Kitchen" (8 December 2008 – Digital single / Promo)
 "Broken Hearts" (6 May 2009 – Digital single / Promo)
 "Before I Marry You" (28 March 2011 – Digital single / Promo)
 "Easy Love" (2011) (29 August 2011 – Digital single / Promo)

Music videos 
 "Social Butterfly" (2008)
 "Love in a Bottle" (2008)
 "Before I Marry You" (2011)
 "Easy Love" (2011)

References

External links 
 Official site

1979 births
Finnish male models
Finnish pop singers
Finnish male singer-songwriters
Living people
Swedish-speaking Finns
21st-century Finnish male singers